The cabinet of Alexandru Golescu was the government of Romania from 2 February to 18 April 1870.

Ministers
The ministers of the cabinet were as follows:

President of the Council of Ministers:
Alexandru G. Golescu (2 February - 18 April 1870)
Minister of the Interior: 
Alexandru G. Golescu (2 February - 18 April 1870)
Minister of Foreign Affairs: 
(interim) Alexandru G. Golescu (2 February - 18 April 1870)
Minister of Finance:
Ioan Al. Cantacuzino (2 February - 18 April 1870)
Minister of Justice:
Dimitrie P. Vioreanu (2 February - 18 April 1870)
Minister of War:
Col. George Manu (2 February - 18 April 1870)
Minister of Religious Affairs and Public Instruction:
George Mârzescu (2 February - 18 April 1870)
Minister of Public Works:
Dimitrie Cozadini (2 February - 18 April 1870)

References

Cabinets of Romania
Cabinets established in 1870
Cabinets disestablished in 1870
1870 establishments in Romania
1870 disestablishments in Romania